James Coleman (born 1941) is an Irish installation and video artist associated with slide-tape works: sequences of still images fading one into the other with synchronized sound. Often, social situations are depicted with a precision which, paradoxically, creates a narrative ambiguity. 

James Coleman was born in Ballaghaderreen, County Roscommon.  He studied at the National College of Art and Design, Dublin, and at University College, Dublin and then spent time in Paris and London before moving to Milan, where he stayed for twenty years. He now lives and works in Ireland. He represented Ireland in the 1973 Paris Biennale. His many exhibitions include a large retrospective shown in a number of major galleries throughout Dublin in 2009. 

He was conferred with the degree of Doctor of Fine Arts honoris causa by the National University of Ireland at NUI Galway in June 2006.

Work in collections
S.M.A.K. - Stedelijk Museum voor Actuele Kunst, Gent
Fondation Cartier pour l'art contemporain, Paris
Musée National d'Art Moderne, Paris
Museum Ludwig, Cologne
Irish Museum of Modern Art, Dublin
Museu d'Art Contemporani de Barcelona, Barcelona
Kunstmuseum Luzern, Luzern

References

Paula Murphy (2002), Coleman, James in Brian Lalor (Ed.), The Encyclopedia of Ireland. Dublin: Gill & Macmillan.

External links
Simon Lee Gallery, London.
Exhibited at DIA Chelsea
Irish Museum of Modern Art  announces purchase of important works by James Coleman.
 Aosdána biographical note
Exhibition at Documenta 12
Exhibition at Fundació Antoni Tàpies.

1941 births
Living people
Irish installation artists
Irish contemporary artists
Aosdána members
People from County Roscommon
Alumni of the National College of Art and Design